Louis Duvernois (born 17 May 1941 in Le Creusot) is a French politician and a member of the Senate of France. He is a member of the Union for a Popular Movement Party.

References
Page on the Senate website

1941 births
Living people
People from Le Creusot
Rally for the Republic politicians
Union for a Popular Movement politicians
Gaullism, a way forward for France
French Senators of the Fifth Republic
Senators of French citizens living abroad